Egla may refer to:

 Egil's Saga
 Egla Harxhi, the Albanian beauty pageant contestant
 EGLA airport, ICAO code for Bodmin Airfield